During the Parade of Nations section of the 1988 Winter Olympics opening ceremony, athletes from the participating countries marched into the arena. Each delegation was led by a flag bearer and a sign with the name of the country on it. The Parade of Nations was organized in English, one of the official languages in Canada. As tradition dictates, Greece led the parade and Canada was the last to march to the stadium as the host nation.
Organizers played Happy Birthday to You during Australia's team march  as a homage to Australia which was celebrating Bicentenary event at that time.

List

References

External links
Countries - Sports-Reference.com

1988 Winter Olympics
Lists of Olympic flag bearers